The Treur River barb (Enteromius treurensis) or simply Treur barb is a species of cyprinid fish. It is endemic to northern Mpumalanga, South Africa.

Status
Exotic fish like smallmouth bass, brown and rainbow trout were introduced to the Blyde, which reduced its range to upper catchments of the Blyde River system. It disappeared from the Treur River in the 1960s, but during the 1970s it was rediscovered in the upper Blyde River, an area that received National Heritage status in 1985. It was reintroduced to the Treur and upper Blyde rivers, where it now flourishes.

It occurs alongside the Natal mountain catfish (Amphilius natalensis), that occurs here as an isolated population in the Limpopo system.

See also
 Blyde River Canyon Nature Reserve

Sources

Enteromius
Cyprinid fish of Africa
Freshwater fish of South Africa
Fish described in 1958
Taxonomy articles created by Polbot